This is a list of products produced by the Milton Bradley Company.

Board games
 13 Dead End Drive (1993)
 The Adventures of Superman (1940)
 Superman and Superboy Game (1967)
 Superman II (1981)
 Aggravation (1962)
 The American Dream Game (1979)
 The American Heritage historical war-game series:
 Battle Cry, American Civil War (1961)
 Broadside, War of 1812 naval (1962)
 Dogfight, World War I aerial (1963)
 Hit the Beach, World War II amphibious (1965)
 Skirmish, American Revolution (1975)
 The Amazing Spider-Man Game with the Fantastic Four! (1967)
 Spider-Man game (1995)
 Animorphs: The Invasion Game (1998)
 Annie Oakley Game (1950)
 Ants in the Pants (1969)
 Ask Me Another (1984)
 Axis & Allies (1981)
 The Baby-Sitters Club Game (1989)
 Back Off! Buzzard (1990)
 Backgammon Tutor (1975)
 Bali (1978)
 Baretta (1976)
 Bargain Hunter (1981)
 The Barnabas Collins Dark Shadows Game (1969)
 Barrel of Monkeys (1965)
 Bash! (1965)
 Baseball: Approved by Little League for Little Leaguers and their Fathers (1958)
 The Batman Game (1966)
 Battle Cry: A Civil War Game (American Heritage magazine) 1961-1965
 Battle Masters (1992), produced in conjunction with Games Workshop
 Battleship (1967)
 Battleship Galaxies (2011)
 Bed Bugs (1985)
 Beetle (a.k.a. Cootie) (1927) 
 Beetle Bailey: The Old Army Game (1963)
 Benji Detective Game (1979)
 Bermuda Triangle (1976)
 Big Foot (1977)
 The Bonkers Game (1993)
 Bradley's Toy Money Complete with Game of Banking
 Bratz Passion for Fashion (2002)
 Breaker19 (1976)
 Broadside (American Heritage magazine) 1961-1965
 Buckaroo! (1970)
 Yahoo Buckaroo! (1991)
 Buffy the Vampire Slayer: The Game (2000)
 Bugaloos Game (1971)
 Camp Granada (1965)
 Candy Land (1949)
 The Captain America Game (1966)
 Captain America Game (Featuring the Falcon and the Avengers) (1977)
 Carrier Strike (1977)
 Casino Bingo (1978)
 Casper the Friendly Ghost Game (1959)
 Catnip (1996)
 Championship Baseball (1984)
 Charlie's Angels (1977)
 Checkout Game: 4 Square Food-Market Shopping Game (1959)
 Cheyenne (1958)
 Chicken Limbo (1994)
 The Chronicles of Narnia: The Lion, The Witch and The Wardrobe Game (2005)
 Choo-Choo aka Shuffle (1977)
 Chutes and Ladders VCR (1986)
 Clix (1938)
 Columbo Detective Game (1973)
 Connect Four (1974)
 Connect 4x4 (2009)
 Conspiracy (1973)
 Cootie (1927)
 Crack The Case (1993)
 Crash Canyon (1989)
 Crocodile Dentist (1990)
 The Crocodile Hunter Outback Chase Game (2000)
 Cross Up (1974)
 Cross Up Poker (1968)
 Crossfire (1971)
 Crossword (1978)
 Curse of the Idol (1990)
 The Dark Crystal Game (1982)
 Dark Tower (1981)
 Daytona 500 (1990)
 Deflection (1981)
 Disney board game series:
 101 Dalmatians Game (1991)
 Aladdin: The Magic Carpet Game (1992)
 Aladdin: The Series (1994)
 Chip'n Dale: Rescue Rangers Game (1991)
 Cinderella Storybook (puzzle game) (1989)
 Disney Presents Cartoon Classics VCR Board Game (1986)
 Disney Presents Movie Classics VCR Board Game (1980)
 Disney Princess Gowns & Crowns Game (2005)
 Disney's All Aboard Game (1986)
 Disney's Beauty and the Beast (1991)
 Disney's DuckTales Game (1989)
 Disney's The Hunchback of Notre Dame Festival of Fools Card Game (1996)
 Disney's The Lion King Circle of Life Dominoes (2003)
 Disney's Talespin Game (1991)
 Euro Disneyland (1992)
 Follow That Mouse (1986)
 Gettin' Goofy Game (1992)
 The Lion King (1993)
 The Lion King Matching Game (1994)
 The Little Mermaid (1990)
 Mickey Mouse & Friends Light & Learn
 Mickey Mouse Follow the Leader Game (1971)
 Mickey Mouse Memory Game (1990)
 Mickey Mouse Spin-A-Round Game
 Mickey's Stuff For Kids Hoppin' Checkers (1993)
 Pinocchio Game (1992)
 Pocahontas Game (1994)
 Spinning Wishes (2002)
 Walt Disney Productions' Robin Hood Game (1973)
 Walt Disney Rescue Rangers
 Walt Disney World Magic Kingdom Game (1972)
 Walt Disney's Snow White And The Seven Dwarfs Game (1992)
 Dogfight (American Heritage magazine) (1961-1965)
 Domination (1982)
 Don't Break the Ice (1968)
 Don't Spill the Beans (1957)
 Double Frustration (1995)
 Doubletrack (1981)
 Down the Hatch (1983)
 Downfall (1973)
 Dragon Strike (2002)
 Dragonmaster (1981)
 Dragster (1976)
 Drive Ya Nuts (1970)
 Easy Money (1966)
 El Tigre Crucificado (Colombia) (1983) 
 Electronic Arcade Mania (1983)
 The Emergency! Game (1973)
 Enchanted Palace (1994-1995)
 Fat Chance (1978)
 Feeley Meeley (1967)
 Felix the Cat Game (1960)
 Fireball Island (1986)
Fishin' Around (1997)
 Five Star Final (1937)
 The Flintstones Game (1971)
 Flivver Game (1922)
 Forbidden Bridge (1992)
 Fraggle Rock Game (1984)
 Fraidy Cats (1994)
 Frantic Frogs (1965)
 Frustration! (aka Trouble) (1965)
 The Gamemaster series:
 Axis and Allies (1984)
 Broadsides and Boarding Parties (1984)
 Conquest of the Empire (1984)
 Fortress America (1986)
 Shogun (1986)
 G.I. Joe Adventure Board Game (1982)
 G.I. Joe Combat Fighters (2002)
 G.I. Joe Commando Attack (1985)
 G.I. Joe Live The Adventure (1986)
 G.I. Joe Mission: Cobra H.Q. Game (2002)
 Game of Games (1986)
 The Game of Guided Missile (1964)
 The Game of Life:
 The Checkered Game of Life (1860)
 Game of Life (1978)
 Game of Life (1992)
 Game of Life (2000)
 The Game of Life 100th Anniversary Game (1963)
 Game of Life - A Jedi's Path (2002)
 Game of Life - Pirates of the Caribbean (2004)
 Game of Life - Pirates of the Caribbean: Dead Man's Chest (2006)
 Game of Life - Twists and Turns (2007)
 Game of the States (copyright 1940)
 Ghosts! (1980)
 Go For Broke (1965)
 Go! Go! Worms (1993)
 Go to the Head of the Class (1936)
 Godzilla (1998)
 Good Ol' Charlie Brown Game (1971)
 The Goonies game (1985)
 Goosebumps: A Night in Terror Tower Game (1996)
 Goosebumps: One Day at Horrorland Game (1996)
 Goosebumps: Terror in the Graveyard Game (1995)
 Guess Who? (1982)
 Hands Down (1988)
 Hang in There! (2000)
 Hangman (1976)
 Happiness (1972)
 The Harlem Globetrotters Game (1971)
 Headache (1968), first published by Kohner Brothers
 Heads Up
 HeartThrob (1988)
 HeroQuest (1989), produced in conjunction with Games Workshop
 HeroScape (2004)
 High School Musical 3 Mystery Date Game (2008)
 Hit the Beach (American Heritage magazine) 1961-1965
 The Hobbit: The Adventures of Bilbo in Middle-earth from The Lord of the Rings (1978)
 Hopalong Cassidy Game (1950)
 Hotel (1986)
 Hotel Tycoon (1974)
 The Houndcats Game (1973)
 Huckleberry Hound (1981)
 Huckleberry Hound Tiddledy Winks Tennis (1959)
 Huckleberry Hound Western Game (1959)
 Hungry Hungry Hippos (1978)
 I Dream Of Jeannie (1965)
 Ice Cube (1972)
 Input (1984)
 Inwords (1972)
 Itsy Bitsy Spider (2002)
 It from the Pit (1992)
 James Bond Secret Agent 007 Game (1964)
 James Bond 007: Goldfinger (1966)
 James Bond 007: Thunderball (1965)
 Jenga (1986)
 Jenga Casino (2001)
 Jenga Jacks (2002)
 Jenga Truth-or-Dare (2000)
 Jenga Ultimate (1995)
 Jenga Xtreme (2003)
 Throw 'n Go Jenga (1986)
 Jogo X-Men (1996)
 Jumanji (1995)
 Jurassic Park Game (1993)
 Jurassic Park III Island Survival Game (2001)
 Jurassic Park III: The Spinosaurus Chase Game (2001)
 The Lost World Jurassic Park Game (1996)
 Karate Fighters (1995)
 KerPlunk (1967)
 Kick-Off (a.k.a. Gazza! The Game) (1960)
 King Leonardo and His Subjects Game (1965)
 King Oil (1974)
 Knock 'em Out (1980)
 Knock Knock Game (1982)
 Knockout (1991)
 KooKooNauts (1995)
 Kreskin's ESP (1967)
 Laser Attack (1978)
 Last Word (1986)
 Link Letters (1963)
 Little Orphan Annie (1927)
 Little Orphan Annie Travel Game (1930)
 Littlest Pet Shop (1993)
 Littlest Pet Shop Game (2005)
 Littlest Pet Shop Game: Prettiest Pet Show (2005)
 Littlest Pet Shop: Hideaway Haven Game (2008)
 Littlest Pet Shop Mall Madness (2008)
 Loopin' Louie (1992)
 Lost in Space (1965)
 Lucy's Tea Party Game (1971)
 Mall Madness (1988) 
 Electronic Mall Madness (1989)
 Littlest Pet Shop Mall Madness (2008)
 Mall Madness (1993)
 Manhunt (1972)
 Maniac Mouse (1993)
 Marvel Comics Super Heroes Strategy Game (1980)
 Matching Pairs (1981)
 Matchwitz (1970)
 Max Backtalk (1986)
 Memory (1966)
 Men into Space (1960)
 Mighty Morphin Power Rangers Game (1994)
 Milton the Monster (1966)
 Mission Command Air (2003)
 Mission Command Land (2003)
 Mission Command Sea (2003)
 The Monster Squad Game (1977)
 The Moon Mullins Game (1938)
 Mother's Helper (1968)
 Mouse Trap (1963)
 Mr. Pop! (1980)
 Mr. T (1983)
 My First Operation (2002)
 My Little Pony Game (1988)
 My Little Pony Hide & Seek (2005)
 Mystery Date (1965)
 Mystery Mansion (1984)
 New Kids on the Block Game (1990)
 Official Baseball Game (1969)
 Omega Virus (1992)
 Oodles (1992)
 Operation (1965)
 The Outer Limits (1964)
 Pachisi (400)
 Park and Shop (1954)
 The Partridge Family Game (1971)
 Pass the Pigs (1977)
 Pathfinder (1974)
 Pathfinder (1977)
 Perfection (1973)
 Picnic Panic (1992)
 Pirate and Traveler (1908)
 Pirate and Traveler game (1911)
 Planet of the Apes (1974)
 Polar Dare! (1991)
 Police Chase (2002)
 Popeye (1981)
 Posse Thirteen Against One (1970)
 Power Barons (1986)
 Prize Property (1974)
 Pretty Pretty Princess (1990)
 Rack-O (1956)     
 Ready! Set! Spaghetti! (1989)
 Real Ghostbusters Game (1984)
 The Real Ghostbusters Game (1986)
 Richie Rich (1982)
 Road Runner Game (1968)
 Rock the Boat (1978)
 Rock 'Em Sock 'Em Robots (1967)
 Rock-Jocks (1994)
 Sailor Moon (1995)
 Scattergories (1988)
 Scattergories Junior (1989)
 Scavenger Hunt (1983)
 Scotland Yard (1985)
 Screaming Eagles (1987)
 Sealab 2020 (1973)
 Seance (1972)
 The Shadow (1994)
 Shark Attack (1988)
 Shenanigans Game (1964)
 Shogun (1986)
 Shop (1981)
 Shrunken Head Apple Sculpture (1975)
 Shuffle aka Choo-Choo(1977)
 Slide 5 (1980)
 Smuggle (1981)
 The Smurf Game (1981)
 Baby Smurf (1984)
 The Smurf Game (1988)
 The Smurf Game Happy-time Picture Matching (1983)
 Smurf Spin-A-Round Game (1983)
 Snakes and Ladders (-200)
 Space: 1999 (1976)
 Space Crusade (1990), produced in conjunction with Games Workshop
 Spider Wars (1988)
 Splat! (1990)
 Spy vs Spy (1986)
 Square Mile (1962)
 Star Trek Game (1979)
 Star Trek: The Next Generation - A Klingon Challenge (1993)
 Star Wars Epic Duels (2002)
 Stay Alive (1965)
 Stratego (board game) series:
 Stratego (1947)
 Electronic Stratego (1982)
 Stratego (Revised Edition) (2008)
 Stratego: The Chronicles of Narnia (2005)
 Stratego: Duel Masters (2004)
 Stratego: The Lord of the Rings (2004)
 Stratego: Pirates of the Caribbean at World's End (2007)
 Stratego: Star Wars (2002)
 Stratego: Star Wars Saga Edition (2005)
 Stratego: Transformers (2007)
 Stuff Yer Face (1982)
 Stump (1968)
 Sub Attack Game (1966)
 Sub Search (1973)
 Sunken Treasure (1976)
 Super 3 (1978)
 Super Rack-O (1983)
 Supercar (1962)
 Swayze (1954)
 Sweet Valley High (1988)
 Tank Battle (1975)
 T.H.I.N.G.S.: Totally Hilarious Incredibly Neat Games of Skill (1987)
 Astro-Nots (1987)
 Dr.Wack-O (1987)
 E-E-Egor (1987)
 Eggzilla (1987)
 Flip-O-Potamus (1987)
 Go-Rilla (1987)
 Grabbit (1987)
 Jack B. Timber (1987)
 Sir Ring-A-Lot (1987)
 Teenage Mutant Ninja Turtles Game (2003)
 Teenage Mutant Ninja Turtles: Pizza Power Game (1987)
 This Game is Bonkers!
 Thundarr The Barbarian (1982)
 Thunder Road (1986)
 Thundercats (1985)
 Times To Remember (1991)
 Tommy Twinkles Number Game (1923)
 Torpedo Run! (1986)
 Tower Climb (1971)
 The Transformers Game (1986)
 The Transformers Warrior Robot Game (1985)
 Trouble (1965)
 Tuba Ruba (1987)
 Trump: The Game (1989)
 Turbo Asticot (1994)
 Twister (1966)
 Animal Twister (1967)
 Bratz Twister (2005)
 Uncle Wiggily (1916)
 Underdog Game (1964)
 Upwords (1983)
 Vampire Hunter (2002)
 Voice of the Mummy (1971)
 Voyage to the Bottom of the Sea Game (1964)
 The Wacky Races Game (1969)
 Weapons & Warriors: Castle Combat Set (1993)
 What Did Grandma Peterson Do To The Cat? (1976)
 Where's The Beef? (1984)
 Which Witch? (game) (1970s)
 Whirl Out (1971)
 Why (1958)
 Wide World of Sports Auto Racing Game (1975)
 Wide World of Sports Golf Game (1975)
 Wide World of Sports Tennis Game (1975)
 Win A Card (1969)
 Wizzword (1977)
 The World of Micronauts Game (1978)
 Yahtzee (1956, MB from 1973)
 Casino Yahtzee (1986)
 Challenge Yahtzee (1974)
 Family Game Night Book and Game Set: Scrabble, Clue, Sorry, Yahtzee (2001)
 Jackpot Yahtzee (1980)
 Mickey Mouse Yahtzee (1988)
 Showdown Yahtzee (1991)
 Triple Yahtzee (1972)
 Word Yahtzee (1978)
 Yahtzee Deluxe Poker (1994)
 Yahtzee: Dragon Ball Z (2000)
 Yahtzee Jr. (2002)
 Yogi Bear Game (1971)

Jigsaw Puzzles

Handheld and electronic games
 Bigtrak (1979)
 Bop It! (1996)
 Bop-It Bounce! (2009)
 Comp IV (1978)
 Electronic Battleship (1977)
 Electronic Battleship Advanced Mission (2000)
 Electronic Battleship Advanced Mission (second edition) (aka Deluxe Battleship Movie Edition) (2006)
 Electronic Battleship: Star Wars (aka Battleship: Star Wars Advanced Mission) (2002)
 Electronic Talking Battleship (1989)
 Electronic Stratego (1982)
 Fang Bang (1967)
 Gator Golf (1994)
 Grand Master (1982)
 Heads Up (2000)
 Lolli Plop (1962)
 Merlin (1978)
 Milton (1980)
 Mr. Bucket (1992)
 OMNI Entertainment System (1980)
 Simon (1978)
 Super Simon (1979)
 Pocket Simon (1980)
 Simon Squared (2000)
 Simon Stix (2004)
 Simon Trickster (2005)
 Skill-it (Frying pan maze) (1966)
 Split Second
 Star Bird (1978)
 Waterfuls (1987-1990s)
 Yahtzee

Home versions of television game shows
 Beat the Clock (1969, two editions)
 Big Numbers: The High Rollers Game (1975, two editions)
 Blockbusters (1982)
 Break the Bank (1977)
 Concentration (1958, 24 editions)
 Crystal Maze (1991)
 Eye Guess (1966, four editions through 1969)
 Family Feud (1977, eight editions)
 Hollywood Squares (1980, 1986)
 Jackpot (1974, two editions)
 Jeopardy! (1964, 13 editions)
 The Joker's Wild (1973, two editions)
 Joker! Joker! Joker! (1979, two editions)
 Let's Make a Deal (1964)
 Match Game (1963, six editions; 1974, three editions)
 Name That Tune (1957, two editions)
 Now You See It (1975)
 Password (1962, 24 editions)
 Password Plus (1979, three editions)
 The Price is Right (1964; 1973, three editions; 1986)
 Pyramid (1974, eight editions through 1981)
 Sale of the Century (1970, two editions)
 Shenanigans (1964, two editions)
 Three on a Match (1972)
 Wheel of Fortune (1975, two editions)
 The Who, What, or Where Game (1970, two editions)
 Win, Lose or Draw (1987, many editions)
 You Don't Say! (1963)

Home versions of television shows
 Dinosaurs Gotta Love Me (1991)
 Home and Away (1989)
 Mork & Mindy (1978)
 Tom & Jerry Chase Game (1983)

Home versions of video games
 Berzerk (1983)
 Centipede (1983)
 Defender (1983)
 Donkey Kong (1982)
 Donkey Kong Country (1995)
 Frogger (1981)
 Jungle Hunt (1983)
 The Legend of Zelda (1988)
 Ms. Pac-Man Game (1982)
 Pac-Man (1980)
 Pitfall! (1983)
 Pokémon Master Trainer III (2005)
 Sonic the Hedgehog Game (1992)
 Street Fighter II (1994)
 Super Mario Bros (1988)
 Turbo (1983)
 Zaxxon (1982)

Video games
 Abadox (1990) for the NES
 Cabal (1990) for the NES
 California Games (1989) for the NES
 Captain Skyhawk (1990) for the NES
 Corvette Zr-1 Challenge (1990) for the NES (European release only)
 Digger T. Rock (1990) for the NES
 Jeopardy! (1983) for the OMNI
 Jordan vs Bird: One on One (1989) for the NES
 Marble Madness (1989) for the NES
 Spitfire Attack (1983) for the Atari 2600
 Survival Run (1983) for the Atari 2600
 Time Lord (1990) for the NES
 World Games (1989) for the NES

Video game consoles
 Microvision (1979)
 OMNI Entertainment System (1980)
 Vectrex (1983–84)

References

External links
 Voice of the Mummy, the Milton Bradley board game - a website dedicated to the record player repair and Seance board game
 Milton Bradley game listings and information in the Association for Games & Puzzles International's Game Catalog
 Milton Bradley game listings and information at BoardGameGeek

Milton Bradley Company products
Game manufacturers